Results of Acropolis Rally (54th BP Ultimate Acropolis Rally of Greece), 8th round of 2007 World Rally Championship, was run on May 31 - June 3:



Results

Retirements 
  François Duval - engine failure (SS4/5);
  Leszek Kuzaj - mechanical, his car burned down (SS10);
  Kristian Sohlberg - tyre problems (SS12/13);
  Juho Hanninen - steering arm/fuel pump failure (SS19);

Special Stages

Championship standings after the event

Drivers' championship

Manufacturers' championship

External links 
 Results on official site - WRC.com
 Results on eWRC-results.com
 Results on RallyBase.nl

Acropolis
Acropolis
2007